Cinemax is an independent Czech video game developer and publisher. The studio was founded by Lukáš Macura. The studio focuses on computer, mobile and console games.

Developed games 
 1997 – Gooka
 1998 – The Hussite
 1999 – In the Raven Shadow
 2001 – State of War
 2005 – Evil Days of Luckless John
 2005 – Necromania: Trap of Darkness
 2005 – Daemonica
 2006 – Gumboy: Crazy Adventures
 2007 – Gumboy: Crazy Features
 2007 – State of War 2: Arcon
 2008 – Gumboy:Tournament
 2009 – Puzzle Rocks
 2009 – Numen: Contest of Heroes
 2009 – Inquisitor
 2010 – Sokomania
 2010 – Snakeoid
 2012 – Decathlon 2012
 2012 – Retro Decathlon 2012
 2012 – Gyro13
 2013 – 247 Missiles
 2013 – hexee—smash the match
 2014 – Wormi
 2014 – Sokomania 2: Cool Job
 2014 – The Keep
 2019 - Jim is Moving Out!
 TBA - Automatica: Programmable Battle Droids

References

External links 
Games by Cinemax
Published games
Cinemax on Slovak server abcgames.cz

Video game companies of the Czech Republic
Video game companies established in 1997